Brown v. Maryland, 25 U.S. (12 Wheat.) 419 (1827), was a significant United States Supreme Court case which interpreted the Import-Export and Commerce Clauses of the U.S. Constitution to prohibit discriminatory taxation by states against imported items after importation, rather than only at the time of importation. The state of Maryland passed a law requiring importers of foreign goods to obtain a license for selling their products. Brown was charged under this law and appealed. It was the first case in which the U.S. Supreme Court construed the Import-Export Clause. Chief Justice John Marshall delivered the opinion of the court, ruling that Maryland's statute violated the Import-Export and Commerce Clauses and the federal law was supreme. He alleged that the power of a state to tax goods did not apply if they remained in their "original package". A license tax on the importer was essentially the same as a tax on an import itself. Despite arguing the case for Maryland, future chief justice Roger Taney admitted that the case was correctly decided.

Background
In 1821, the Maryland legislature passed a law which required anyone who sold imported items to obtain a license, costing fifty dollars (approximately $1076 in 2016 dollars), before the imported goods could be legally sold in the state. The plaintiff was charged with importing one package of dry goods and selling it without a license. Counsel for the plaintiff contended that this violated two clauses of the U.S. Constitution: the Import-Export Clause and the Commerce Clause.

The Import Export Clause (Article I, Section 10, Clause 2) states that:

The Commerce Clause (Article I, Section 8, Clause 3) states that:

Both the City Court of Baltimore and, on appeal, the Court of Appeals of Maryland upheld the charges against Brown for violating an act of the Maryland legislature. The U.S. Supreme Court accepted the case to determine "whether the legislature of a state can constitutionally require the importer of foreign articles to take out a license from the state before he shall be permitted to sell a bale or package so imported."

Court's opinion

Chief Justice John Marshall delivered the majority opinion. He summarized the question at issue by stating that the case "depends entirely on the question whether the legislature of a state can constitutionally require the importer of foreign articles to take out a license from the state before he shall be permitted to sell a bale or package so imported."

Import-Export Clause
The Import-Export Clause had not previously been construed by the U.S. Supreme Court. Marshall began with a lexicographical analysis of the Import-Export Clause:

The Import-Export Clause has an exception for state inspection laws. Since state inspections were carried out on land, for both imports and exports, a "tax or duty of inspection" was "frequently, if not always, paid for service performed on land" once the imported item was within the country. Marshall thus concluded that "th[e] exception in favor of duties for the support of inspection laws goes far in proving that the framers of the Constitution classed taxes of a similar character with those imposed for the purposes of inspection, with duties on imports and exports, and supposed them to be prohibited." However, he found that this narrow view of the subject was not enough to strike down the Maryland tax on importers and proceeded to examine the motivation of the Founders in including the Import-Export tax and its role in the federal framework of the Constitution.

Imposts and duties on imports and exports was a subject given solely to Congress, "plainly because, in the general opinion, the interest of all would be best promoted by placing that whole subject under the control of Congress." Regardless of whether that power was to prevent state taxation from disrupting harmony between the states, prevent states from hindering uniform trade relations between the US and foreign nations, or reserve this source of revenue solely to the government, "it is plain that the object would be as completely defeated by a power to tax the article in the hands of the importer the instant it was landed as by a power to tax it while entering the port. There is no difference in effect between a power to prohibit the sale of an article and a power to prohibit its introduction into the country. ... No goods would be imported if none could be sold." It was not relevant how small or large the tax was or whether states would act in a manner injurious to their commercial interests, as "it cannot be conceded that each [state] would respect the interests of others." Furthermore, if the major importing states levied taxes on imports that were then transported to other states, the latter would likely impose countervailing measures.

Marshall then addresses an issue that Maryland had argued "with great reason": that prohibiting taxation of imports would greatly interfere in the power of taxation that is "essential" to the states. Maryland insisted that the point when the prohibition on taxation ends should be the time of importation, to which Marshall responded:

The plaintiffs' attorney argued that the payment of import duties to the federal government necessarily conferred on importers the right to sell the imports. Maryland argued that such a reading would allow importers to "exert that right when, where, and as [they] please[]" or allow them to use the imported items for personal use and thus obtain valuable items not subject to household excise taxes.

Commerce Clause
Marshall began this analysis by noting that "[t]he oppressed and degraded state of commerce previous to the adoption of the Constitution can scarcely be forgotten." Although Congress could make treaties with foreign nations, prior to the adoption of the federal Constitution, the states regulated foreign commerce in their own interests and Congress could not effectively enforce treaty obligations on the states. Therefore, it is unsurprising that Congress' power under the Commerce Clause "should be as extensive as the mischief and should comprehend all foreign commerce and all commerce among the states." The extent of Congress' Commerce Clause power was resolved in Gibbons v. Ogden, 22 U.S. (9 Wheat.) 1 (1824), which determined that it does not end at a state's border but extends to commerce within a state "must be capable of authorizing the sale of those articles which it introduces." "Sale is the object of importation", therefore, "Congress has a right not only to authorize importation, but to authorize the importer to sell." Although Maryland's tax was on the importer rather than the imports, it was "too obvious for controversy" that such a tax interferes with Congress' ability to regulate commerce.

The opinion concluded by noting: "It may be proper to add that we suppose the principles laid down in this case to apply equally to importations from a sister state. We do not mean to give any opinion on a tax discriminating between foreign and domestic articles."

Legacy
Twenty years after the Brown decision, Roger Taney, who had succeeded Marshall as Chief Justice of the United States in 1836, remarked on the case and the wisdom of Marshall's decision:

In Brown v. Maryland, Chief Justice Marshall remarked on the applicability of the Import-Export Clause to interstate commerce, remarking that "we suppose the principles laid down in this case, to apply equally to importations from a sister State." In 1860, Chief Justice Taney, wrote the Supreme Court's opinion in Almy v. California, which found a tax on a bill of lading for gold dust exported from California to New York violated the Import Export Clause. "We think this case cannot be distinguished from that of Brown v. Maryland," he wrote, concluding that "the state tax in question is a duty upon the export of gold and silver, and consequently repugnant to the [Import-Export Clause]." In 1869, however, the Supreme Court determined that the Import-Export Clause applied only to foreign trade and not trade between the states.

In Low v. Austin, 80 U.S. 29 (1872), the Supreme Court was given the question of "whether imported merchandise, upon which the duties and charges at the custom-house have been paid, is subject to State taxation, whilst remaining in the original cases, unbroken and unsold, in the hands of the importer." The court, drawing on Brown and the opinion of Chief Justice Taney in the License Cases, 46 U.S. 504 (1847), decided that:

This doctrine, which became known as the "original package doctrine", would define the interpretation of the Import-Export Clause for over a century until the U.S. Supreme Court redefined its analysis of the Import-Export Clause in Michelin Tire Corp. v. Wages, 423 U.S. 276 (1976). In Michelin, the U.S. Supreme Court launched a sua sponte investigation of the meaning and purpose of the Import-Export Clause, summarizing it thusly:

The Michelin Court made a lengthy and thorough analysis of the Brown opinion and how it was misread in Low v. Austin, which "[held] that the Court in Brown included nondiscriminatory ad valorem property taxes among prohibited 'imposts' or 'duties.'"

See also
 List of United States Supreme Court cases, volume 25
 Peterswald v Bartley - seminal case of the High Court of Australia that analyzed Brown v. Maryland when interpreting "duties of excise" in a provision of Australia's Constitution similar to the Import-Export Clause

References

External links

 

1827 in United States case law
United States Constitution Article One case law
United States Supreme Court cases
United States Dormant Commerce Clause case law
Legal history of Maryland
1827 in Maryland
United States Supreme Court cases of the Marshall Court